Anatea is an ant-mimicking genus of South Pacific comb-footed spiders that was first described by Lucien Berland in 1927.  it contains three species, found in Australia and on New Caledonia: 

Anatea 
Anatea elongata
Anatea formicaria
Anatea monteithi

Originally placed with the sac spiders, it was moved to the comb-footed spiders in 1967.
Previously considered as a genus with a single species, two new species were identified in tropical Australia in 2017. 
Myrmecomorphy is found amongst the salticids and Corinnidae families, but it unusual amongst other theridiids.

See also
 List of Theridiidae species

References

Araneomorphae genera
Taxa named by Lucien Berland
Theridiidae
Spiders of Oceania